Bilal Tarikat (born 12 June 1991) is an Algerian footballer who plays as a midfielder.

References

External links

1991 births
Living people
People from Thénia
People from Thénia District
People from Boumerdès Province
Algerian people
Kabyle people
Association football midfielders
Algerian footballers
Algeria international footballers
CR Belouizdad players
21st-century Algerian people